Dashtesare sharghi Rural District is a rural district (dehestan) in the Dashtesar District of Amol County, Mazandaran Province, Iran. The rural district has 18 villages.

References 

Rural Districts of Mazandaran Province
Amol County